Homeville is a populated place situated in Upper Oxford Township in Chester County, Pennsylvania, United States.

Homeville Friends Meeting House
Built in 1839 and founded as the Oxford Preparative Meeting sponsored by the Fallowfield Monthly Meeting.  In 1842 the meeting joined Pennsgrove Preparative Meeting to form Pennsgrove Monthly Meeting. The meeting was "laid down" or closed in 1915, but meetings for worship are sometimes held during the summer. The Homeville Cemetery Co.maintains the building and large burial ground.

References

Unincorporated communities in Chester County, Pennsylvania
Unincorporated communities in Pennsylvania